In econometrics and other applications of multivariate time series analysis, a variance decomposition or forecast error variance decomposition (FEVD) is used to aid in the interpretation of a vector autoregression (VAR) model once it has been fitted. The variance decomposition indicates the amount of information each variable contributes to the other variables in the autoregression. It determines how much of the forecast error variance of each of the variables can be explained by exogenous shocks to the other variables.

Calculating the forecast error variance 
For the VAR (p) of form

  .

This can be changed to a VAR(1) structure by writing it in companion form (see general matrix notation of a VAR(p))
 where

The mean squared error of the h-step forecast of variable  is 

and where 

 where  is a lower triangular matrix obtained by a Cholesky decomposition of  such that , where   is the covariance matrix of the errors  

The amount of forecast error variance of variable  accounted for by exogenous shocks to variable  is given by

See also 
 Analysis of variance

Notes 

Multivariate time series